
Restaurant t Misverstant is a restaurant in Den Bosch, Netherlands. It was a fine dining restaurant that was awarded one Michelin star in 1984 and retained that rating until 1995.

The star was gained under the leadership of head chef Alexander Koene He voluntarily gave up the Michelin star due to the immense pressure related to it, effectively closing down the restaurant by turning it into a bistro

See also
List of Michelin starred restaurants in the Netherlands

References 

Restaurants in the Netherlands
Michelin Guide starred restaurants in the Netherlands
Restaurants in North Brabant
Buildings and structures in 's-Hertogenbosch